The cinnamon weaver (Ploceus badius) is a species of bird in the family Ploceidae. It is found only in Sudan and South Sudan.
The cinnamon weaver is nomadic, returning to breeding areas during the September–October breeding season. Possibly monogamous, weavers live communally, preferring tall trees with dense foliage.

References

External links
 Cinnamon weaver-  Species text in Weaver Watch.

cinnamon weaver
Birds of Sub-Saharan Africa
cinnamon weaver
Taxonomy articles created by Polbot